The asterisk, from Late Latin , from Ancient Greek , asteriskos, "little star", is a typographical symbol. It is so called because it resembles a conventional image of a heraldic star.

Computer scientists and mathematicians often vocalize it as star (as, for example, in the A* search algorithm or C*-algebra). In English, an asterisk is usually five- or six-pointed in sans-serif typefaces, six-pointed in serif typefaces, and six- or eight-pointed when handwritten. Its most common use is to call out a footnote. It is also often used to censor offensive words.

In computer science, the asterisk is commonly used as a wildcard character, or to denote pointers, repetition, or multiplication.

History

The asterisk has already been used as a symbol in ice age cave paintings. Origen is known to have also used the asteriskos to mark missing Hebrew lines from his Hexapla. The asterisk evolved in shape over time, but its meaning as a symbol used to correct defects remained.

In the Middle Ages, the asterisk was used to emphasize a particular part of text, often linking those parts of the text to a marginal comment. However, an asterisk was not always used.

One hypothesis to the origin of the asterisk is that it stems from the 5000-year-old Sumerian character dingir, though this hypothesis seems to only be based on visual appearance.

Usage

Censorship

When toning down expletives, asterisks are often used to replace letters. For example, the word "badword" might become "ba***rd", "b*****d", "b******" or even "*******". Vowels tend to be censored with an asterisk more than consonants, but the intelligibility of censored profanities with multiple syllables such as "b*dw*rd" and  "b*****d" or "ba****d", or uncommon ones is higher if put in context with surrounding text.

When a document containing classified information is published, the document may be "sanitized" (redacted) by replacing the classified information with asterisks. For example, the Intelligence and Security Committee Russia report.

Competitive sports and games
In colloquial usage, an asterisk attached to a sporting record indicates that it is somehow tainted. This is because results that have been considered dubious or set aside are recorded in the record books with an asterisk rendering to a footnote explaining the reason or reasons for concern.

Baseball
The usage of the term in sports arose during the 1961 baseball season in which Roger Maris of the New York Yankees was threatening to break Babe Ruth's 34-year-old single-season home run record. Ruth had amassed 60 home runs in a season with only 154 games,  but Maris was playing the first season in the American League's newly expanded 162-game season.  Baseball Commissioner Ford Frick, a friend of Ruth's during the legendary slugger's lifetime, held a press conference to announce his "ruling" that should Maris take longer than 154 games both records would be acknowledged by Major League Baseball, but that some "distinctive mark" [his term] be placed next to Maris', which should be listed alongside Ruth's achievement in the "record books".  The asterisk as such a mark was suggested at that time by New York Daily News sportswriter Dick Young, not Frick. The reality, however, was that MLB actually had no direct control over any record books until many years later, and it all was merely a suggestion on Frick's part. Within a few years the controversy died down and all prominent baseball record keepers listed Maris as the single-season record holder.

Nevertheless, the stigma of holding a tainted record remained with Maris for many years, and the concept of a real or figurative asterisk denoting less-than-accepted "official" records has become widely used in sports and other competitive endeavors. A 2001 TV movie about Maris's record-breaking season was called 61* (pronounced sixty-one asterisk) in reference to the controversy.

Uproar over the integrity of baseball records and whether or not qualifications should be added to them arose again in the late 1990s, when a steroid-fueled power explosion led to the shattering of Maris' record.  Even though it was obvious - and later admitted - by Mark McGwire that he was heavily on steroids when he hit 70 home runs in 1998, ruling authorities did nothing to the annoyance of many fans and sportswriters.  Three years later self-confessed steroid-user Barry Bonds pushed that record out to 73, and fans once again began to call for an asterisk in the sport's record books.

Fans were especially critical and clamored louder for baseball to act during the 2007 season, as Bonds approached and later broke Hank Aaron's career home run record of 755.

After an investigation by MLB revealed the Houston Astros' involvement in a sign-stealing scheme during the 2017 season, where they won the World Series, fans appalled by what they perceived to be overly lenient discipline against the Astros players nicknamed the team the "Houston Asterisks".

In recent years, the asterisk has come into use on baseball scorecards to denote a "great defensive play."

Usage in anti-doping campaigns
By the end of the first decade of the 21st century, the association of baseball and its records with doping had become so notorious that the term "asterisk" had become firmly associated with doping in sport. In February 2011 the United States Olympic Committee and the Ad Council launched an anti-steroid campaign called "Play Asterisk Free" aimed at teens.  The campaign, whose logo uses a heavy asterisk(✱), first launched in 2008 under the name Don't Be An Asterisk.

Cricket
 In cricket, it signifies a total number of runs scored by a batsman without losing his wicket; e.g. "107*" means "107 not out".
 Where only the scores of the two batsmen that are currently in are being shown, an asterisk following a batsman's score indicates that he is due to face the next ball to be delivered.
 When written before a player's name on a scorecard, it indicates the captain of the team.
 It is also used on television when giving a career statistic during a match. For example, "47*" in a number of matches column means that the current game is the player's 47th.

Other sports
During the first decades of the 21st century, the term asterisk to denote a tainted accomplishment caught on in other sports first in North America and then, due in part to North American sports' widespread media exposure, around the world.

Computing

Computer science
 In computer science, the asterisk is used in regular expressions to denote zero or more repetitions of a pattern; this use is also known as the Kleene star or Kleene closure after Stephen Kleene. In the Unified Modeling Language, the asterisk is used to denote zero to many classes.

Computer interfaces
 In some command line interfaces, such as the Unix shell and Microsoft's CMD, the asterisk is the wildcard character and stands for any string of characters. This is also known as a wildcard symbol. A common use of the wildcard is in searching for files on a computer. For instance, if a user wished to find a document called Document 1, search terms such as Doc* and D*ment* would return this file. Document* would also return any file that begins with Document.
 In some graphical user interfaces an asterisk is pre- or appended to the current working document name shown in a window's title bar to indicate that unsaved changes exist.
 In many computing and Internet applications an asterisk, or another character, is displayed to indicate that a character of a password or other confidential information has been entered, without the risk of displaying the actual character. 
 In Commodore (and related) files systems, an asterisk appearing next to a filename in a directory listing denotes an improperly closed file, commonly called a "splat file".
 In travel industry Global Distribution Systems, the asterisk is the display command to retrieve all or part of a Passenger Name Record.
 In HTML web forms, an asterisk can be used to denote required fields.
 Chat room etiquette calls on one asterisk to correct a misspelled word that has already been submitted. For example, one could post lck, then follow it with *luck or luck* (the placement of the * on the left or right is a matter of personal style) to correct the word's spelling, or if it's someone else that notices the mistake, they might also use *luck or luck*.
 Enclosing a phrase between two asterisks is used to denote an action the user is "performing", e.g. *pulls out a paper*, although this usage is also common on forums, and less so on most chat rooms due to /me or similar commands. Hyphens (-action-) and double colons (::action::) as well as the operator /me are also used for similar purposes.

Adding machines and printing calculators
 Some models of adding machines and printing calculators use the asterisk to denote the total, or the terminal sum or difference of an addition or subtraction sequence, respectively. The symbol is sometimes given on the printout to indicate this total.

Programming languages
Many programming languages and calculators use the asterisk as a symbol for multiplication. It also has a number of special meanings in specific languages, for instance:
 In some programming languages such as the C, C++, and Go programming languages, the asterisk is used to dereference or declare a pointer variable.
 In the Common Lisp programming language, the names of global variables are conventionally set off with asterisks, *LIKE-THIS*.
 In the Ada, Fortran, Perl, Python, Ruby programming languages, in some dialects of the Pascal programming language, and many others, a double asterisk is used to signify exponentiation: 5**3 is 53 = 125.
 In the Perl programming language, the asterisk is used to refer to the typeglob of all variables with a given name.
 In the programming languages Ruby and Python, * has two specific uses. First, the unary * operator applied to a list object inside a function call will expand that list into the arguments of the function call. Second, a parameter preceded by * in the parameter list for a function will result in any extra positional parameters being aggregated into a tuple (Python) or array (Ruby), and likewise a parameter preceded by ** will result in any extra keyword parameters being aggregated into a dictionary (Python) or hash (Ruby).
 In the APL language, the asterisk represents the exponential and exponentiation functions, with *X representing eX, and Y*X representing YX.
 In IBM Job Control Language, the asterisk has various functions, including in-stream data in the DD statement, the default print stream as SYSOUT=*, and as a self-reference in place of a procedure step name to refer to the same procedure step where it appears.
 In Haskell, the asterisk represents the set of well-formed, fully applied types; that is, a 0-ary kind of types.
 In many markup programming languages, putting text between two asterisks makes the text bold or italic. For example, *Hello world!* will often turn into "Hello world!" or "Hello world!".

Comments in programming languages

In the B programming language and languages that borrow syntax from it, such as C, PHP, Java, or C#, comments in the source code (for information to people, ignored by the compiler) are marked by an asterisk combined with the slash:

 /* This section displays message if user input was not valid
    (comment ignored by compiler) */

Some Pascal-like programming languages, for example, Object Pascal, Modula-2, Modula-3, and Oberon, as well as several other languages including ML, Wolfram Language (Mathematica), AppleScript, OCaml, Standard ML, and Maple, use an asterisk combined with a parenthesis:

 (* Do not change this variable - it is used later
    (comment ignored by compiler) *)

CSS also uses the slash-star comment format.
body {
  /* This ought to make the text more readable for far-sighted people */
  font-size: 24pt;
}

Each computing language has its own way of handling comments;  and similar notations are not universal.

Economics
 In economics, the use of an asterisk after a letter indicating a variable such as price, output, or employment indicates that the variable is at its optimal level (that which is achieved in a perfect market situation). For instance, p* is the price level p when output y is at its corresponding optimal level of y*.
 Also in international economics asterisks are commonly used to denote economic variables in a foreign country. So, for example, "p" is the price of the home good and "p*" is the price of the foreign good, etc.

Education
 In the GCSE and A-Level examinations in the United Kingdom and the PSLE in Singapore, A* ("A-star") is a special top grade that is distinguished from grade A. (This will phase out starting from 2021.)
 In the Hong Kong Diploma of Secondary Education (HKDSE) examination in Hong Kong, 5** (5-star-star) and 5* (5-star) are two special top grades that are distinguished from Level 5. Level 5** is the highest level a candidate can attain in HKDSE.

Fluid mechanics
In fluid mechanics an asterisk in superscript is sometimes used to mean a property at sonic speed.

Games
Certain categories of character types in role-playing games are called splats, and the game supplements describing them are called splatbooks. This usage originated with the shorthand "*book" for this type of supplement to various World of Darkness games, such as Clanbook: Ventrue (for Vampire: The Masquerade) or Tribebook: Black Furies (for Werewolf: The Apocalypse), and this usage has spread to other games with similar character-type supplements. For example, Dungeons & Dragons Third Edition has had several lines of splatbooks: the "X & Y" series including Sword & Fist and Tome & Blood prior to the "3.5" revision, the "Complete X" series including Complete Warrior and Complete Divine, and the "Races of X" series including Races of Stone and Races of the Wild.
In many MUDs and MOOs, as well as "male", "female", and other more esoteric genders, there is a gender called "splat", which uses an asterisk to replace the letters that differ in standard English gender pronouns. For example, h* is used rather than him or her. Also, asterisks are used to signify doing an action, for example, "*action*".
Game show producer Mark Goodson used a six-pointed asterisk as his trademark. It is featured prominently on many set pieces from The Price Is Right.
Scrabble players put an asterisk after a word to indicate that an illegal play was made.

Human genetics
In human genetics, * is used to denote that someone is a member of a haplogroup and not any of its subclades (see * (haplogroup)).

Linguistics

In linguistics, an asterisk is placed before a word or phrase to indicate that it is not used, or there are no records of it being in use. This is used in several ways depending on what is being discussed. It may be used to indicate reconstructed words in proto-languages for which there are no records of the pronunciation, grammar and words.

Historical linguistics 
In historical linguistics, the asterisk marks words or phrases that are not directly recorded in texts or other media, and that are therefore reconstructed on the basis of other linguistic material (see also comparative method).

In the following example, the Proto-Germanic word  is a reconstructed form.
  →  → eleven

A double asterisk indicates a form that would be expected according to a rule, but is not actually found. That is, it indicates a reconstructed form that is not found or used, and in place of which another form is found in actual usage:
 For the plural, * would be expected, but separate masculine plural   and feminine plural   are found as irregular forms.

Ungrammaticality 

In most areas of linguistics, but especially in syntax, an asterisk in front of a word or phrase indicates that the word or phrase is not used because it is ungrammatical.
wake her up / *wake up her
An asterisk before a parenthesis indicates that the lack of the word or phrase inside is ungrammatical, while an asterisk after the opening bracket of the parenthesis indicates that the existence of the word or phrase inside is ungrammatical.
go *(to) the station - Here, "go the station" would be ungrammatical.
go (*to) home - Here, "go to home" would be ungrammatical.

Ambiguity 
Since a word marked with an asterisk could mean either "unattested" or "impossible", it is important in some contexts to distinguish these meanings.  In general, authors retain asterisks for "unattested", and prefix x, **, †, or ? for the latter meaning.  An alternative is to append the asterisk (or another symbol, possibly to differentiate between even more cases) at the end.

Optimality theory
In optimality theory, asterisks are used as "violation marks" in tableau cells to denote a violation of a constraint by an output form.

Phonetic transcription 
In phonetic transcription using the International Phonetic Alphabet, an asterisk was sometimes historically used to denote that the word it preceded was a proper noun. See this example from W. Perrett's 1921 transcription of Gottfried Keller's "":
, ! .
()

This diacritic isn't often used.

Mathematics
The asterisk has many uses in mathematics. The following list highlights some common uses and is not exhaustive.

stand-alone
 An arbitrary point in some set. Seen, for example, when computing Riemann sums or when contracting a simply connected group to the singleton set { ∗ }.
as a unary operator, denoted in prefix notation
 The Hodge star operator on vector spaces .
as a unary operator, written as a subscript
 The pushforward (differential) of a smooth map f between two smooth manifolds, denoted f∗.
 And more generally the application of any covariant functor, where no doubt exists over which functor is meant. 
as a unary operator, written as a superscript
 The complex conjugate of a complex number (the more common notation is ).
 The conjugate in a composition algebra
 The conjugate transpose, Hermitian transpose, or adjoint matrix of a matrix.
 Hermitian adjoint.
 The multiplicative group of the units of a ring; when the ring is a field, this is the group of all nonzero elements. For example, 
 The dual space of a vector space V, denoted V*.
 The combination of an indexed collection of objects into one example, e.g. the combination of all the cohomology groups Hk(X) into the cohomology ring H*(X).
 The reflexive transitive closure of a binary relation.
 In statistics, z* and t* are given critical points for z-distributions and t-distributions, respectively.
as a binary operator, in infix notation
 A notation for an arbitrary binary operator.
 The free product of two groups.
 f ∗ g is a convolution of f with g.
 A notation for the horizontal composition of two natural transformations.
 A notation to denote a parallel sum of two operands (most authors, however, instead use a : or ∥ sign for this purpose).

The asterisk is used in all branches of mathematics to designate a correspondence between two quantities denoted by the same letter – one with the asterisk and one without.

Mathematical typography
In fine mathematical typography, the Unicode character  (in HTML, &lowast;) is available. This character also appeared in the position of the regular asterisk in the PostScript symbol character set in the Symbol font included with Windows and Macintosh operating systems and with many printers. It should be used in fine typography for a large asterisk that lines up with the other mathematical operators.

Music
 In musical notation the sign  indicates when the sustain pedal of the piano should be lifted.
 In liturgical music, an asterisk is often used to denote a deliberate pause.

Religious texts
In the Geneva Bible and the King James Bible, an asterisk is used to indicate a marginal comment or scripture reference.
In the Leeser Bible, an asterisk is used to mark off the seven subdivisions of the weekly Torah portion. It is also used to mark the few verses to be repeated by the reader of the Haftara.
In American printings of the Book of Common Prayer, an asterisk is used to divide a verse of a Psalm in two portions for responsive reading. British printings use a spaced colon (" : ") for the same purpose.
In pointed psalms, an asterisk is used to denote a break or breath.

Star of Life

A Star of Life, a six-bar star overlaid with the Rod of Asclepius (the symbol of health), may be used as an alternative to cross or crescent symbols on ambulances.

Statistical results
In many scientific publications, the asterisk is employed as a shorthand to denote the statistical significance of results when testing hypotheses. When the likelihood that a result occurred by chance alone is below a certain level, one or more asterisks are displayed. Popular significance levels are <0.05 (*), <0.01 (**), and <0.001 (***).

Telephony

On a tone dialling telephone keypad, the asterisk (called star) is one of the two special keys (the other is the 'square key almost invariably replaced by the number sign  (called 'pound sign' (US), 'hash' (other countries), or 'hex'), and is found to the left of the zero.) They are used to navigate menus in systems such as voice mail, or in vertical service codes.

Typography

 The asterisk is used to call out a footnote, especially when there is only one on the page. Less commonly, multiple asterisks are used to denote different footnotes on a page (i.e., *, **, ***). Typically, an asterisk is positioned after a word or phrase and preceding its accompanying footnote. Other characters are also used for this purpose, such as dagger (†, ‡) or superscript letters and numbers (as in Wikipedia). In marketing and advertising, asterisks or other symbols are used to refer readers discreetly to terms or conditions for a certain statement, the "small print".
 In English-language typography the asterisk is placed after all other punctuation marks (for example, commas, colons, or periods) except for the dash.

 Three spaced asterisks centered on a page is called a dinkus and may represent a jump to a different scene, thought, or section.
 A group of three asterisks arranged in a triangular formation is called an asterism. It may be used instead of a name on a title page.
 One or more asterisks may be used as censorship over all or part of a word.
 Asterisks are sometimes used as an alternative to typographical bullets to indicate items of a list.
 Asterisks can be used in textual media to represent *emphasis* when bold or italic text is not available (e.g., Twitter, text messaging).
 Asterisks may denote conversational repair, or corrections to misspelling or misstatements in previous electronic messages, particularly when replacement or retraction of a previous writing is not possible, such as with "immediate delivery" messages or "instant messages" that can't be edited. Usually this takes the form of a message consisting solely of the corrected text, with an asterisk placed before (or after) the correction. For example, one might send a message reading "*morning" or "morning*" to correct the misspelling in the message "I had a good ".
 Bounding asterisks as "a kind of self-describing stage direction", as linguist Ben Zimmer has put it. For example, in "Another gas station robbery *sigh*", the writer uses *sigh* to express disappointment (but does not necessarily literally sigh).

Encodings

The Unicode standard has a variety of asterisk-like characters, compared in the table below. (Characters will display differently in different browsers and fonts.) The reason there are so many is chiefly because of the controversial decision to include in Unicode the entire Zapf Dingbats symbol font.

See also
 
 
 
 
 , for example to identify errors
 List of typographical symbols and punctuation marks
Reference mark, the symbol used in Chinese, Japanese and Korean typography for an equivalent purpose
 Sextile an asterisk-like astrological symbol (⚹), six lines radiating at 60⁰ intervals

Notes

References

Punctuation
Ancient Greek punctuation